Marián Labuda (28 October 1944 – 5 January 2018) was a Slovak actor.

He was born in Hontianske Nemce. In 1964, he graduated from the Academy of Performing Arts in Bratislava (VŠMU). He became a member of the Slovak National Theatre (SND) in Bratislava. In 1967, he moved to the theatre Divadlo na Korze in the same city. Following its closure in 1971 he joined Nová scéna in Bratislava. 

In 1990, he returned to SND. He portrayed more than a hundred characters on stage. He also regularly appeared in both Slovak and Czech films.  As a singer, he recorded the album Silvester 68 with several well-known personalities in Slovakia.  The song "Pichni" from the album was written and sung by himself. 

Labuda died in Bratislava on 5 January 2018, aged 73.

Selected performances
2005 - Tiso in Tiso, Divadlo Aréna (received Dosky Award)
2005 - Leon in The Workroom by Jean-Claude Grumberg, Vinohrady Theatre, Prague
1968 - Estragon in Waiting for Godot

Selected filmography
2016 - Angel of the Lord 2
2008 - Taková normální rodinka
2007 - Roming (Roman)
2006 - I Served the King of England
2000 - Landscape (Kusalik)
1999 - All My Loved Ones
1997 - Lotrando a Zubejda
1997 - Orbis Pictus (Emil)
1997 - On the Beautiful Blue Danube (Výťahár)
1995 - The Garden (Jakub's Father), received Czech Lion for best supporting actor
1994 - The Life and Extraordinary Adventures of Private Ivan Chonkin (Opalikov)
1994 - Accumulator 1
1991 - Tajomstvo alchymistu Storitza (Stepark)
1991 - Meeting Venus
1989 - The End of Old Times (Stoklasa)
1988 - Dobří holubi se vracejí
1985 - My Sweet Little Village (Karel Pávek)1984 - King Thrushbeard (principal, grocer)
1976 - Pacho, the Highhwayman of Hybe (Erdödy)
1976 - Rosy Dreams (Shop Floor Manager)
1966 - Before This Night Is Over

References

External links

1944 births
2018 deaths
Slovak male film actors
Slovak male stage actors
Slovak male television actors
People from Krupina District
Czech Lion Awards winners